Chamod Dilshan Unkiri Hettige Don (born 11 March 1997) is a Sri Lankan footballer who plays as a defender for Sri Lanka Champions League club Colombo and the Sri Lanka national team.

References

External links
 
 

Living people
1997 births
Sri Lankan footballers
Sri Lanka international footballers
Association football defenders
Saunders SC players
Colombo FC players
Sri Lanka Football Premier League players